Malaysia competed at the 2017 Winter Universiade in Almaty, Kazakhstan.

Short track speed skating

See also
Malaysia at the 2017 Summer Universiade

References

2017 in Malaysian sport
Nations at the 2017 Winter Universiade
Malaysia at the Winter Universiade